Events from the year 1907 in China.

Incumbents
Guangxu Emperor (27th year)

Events
 April 20 — Due to the Northeast area of the Great Qing established the administrative regions, Zhu Jiabao was appointed as Governor of Jilin Province.
 China Centenary Missionary Conference
 Peking to Paris automobile race

Births
May 14 - Bo Gu and Gao Zhihang
July 5 - Yang Shangkun
July 14 - Xiao Ke
September 10 - Song Shilun
December 5 - Lin Biao

Deaths
July 7 - Xu Xilin
July 15 - Qiu Jin

 
1900s in China
Years of the 20th century in China